Roger of Torre Maggiore or Master Roger (1205 in Torre Maggiore – April 14, 1266 in Split) was an Italian prelate active in the Kingdom of Hungary in the middle of the 13th century. He was archbishop of Split in Dalmatia from 1249 until his death. His Epistle to the Sorrowful Lament upon the Destruction of the Kingdom of Hungary by the Tatars is a unique and important source of the Mongol invasion of the Kingdom of Hungary in 1241 and 1242.

Early life

According to archdeacon Thomas of Split, Roger was "from a town called Turris Cepia in the region of Benevento", that has been identified with Torre Maggiore in Apulia in Italy. He arrived in the Kingdom of Hungary in the retinue of Cardinal Giacomo da Pecorara, a papal legate sent to King Andrew II of Hungary  in 1232. Although he received the prebend of a chaplainship, and later of the archdeacon in the cathedral chapter of the Diocese of Várad (today Oradea, Romania) in the kingdom, he was in the company of Cardinal Giacomo in Italy between 1236 and 1239. Rogerius quarter, a district in Oradea, Romania, is named after him.

Sorrowful Lament

Master Roger was archdeacon of Várad when the town was captured by the Mongols, who had invaded the kingdom from the east. He fled from the town, "ran away into the forest and hid there as long as" he could. Next, Master Roger arrived in Csanád, but it had also been devastated by the invaders. He was soon captured by the Mongols, but managed to escape as the invaders were withdrawing from Hungary in 1242.

He went to Rome, where he received the post of archdeacon of Sopron in the western part of the Kingdom of Hungary, Várad having been completely destroyed by the Mongols. He took over his new post in 1243, and set about recording his experiences during the Mongol invasion in a letter written to Cardinal Giacomo. His letter provides a "dramatic description of the events" (Florin Curta) leading to the destruction of the kingdom. Following the death of Cardinal Giacomo in 1244, Master Roger was employed by Cardinal John of Toledo. When he accompanied his new master to the First Council of Lyon in 1245, he was already a canon in the diocese of Zagreb.

Archbishop of Split

Master Roger was appointed archbishop of Split by Pope Innocent IV after the death of Archbishop Ugrin, who had died on April 30, 1249. It seems that both the canons of the cathedral chapter and the locals would have preferred a Dominican friar named John. Finally, King Béla IV of Hungary, the supreme lord of the town, approved the appointment of Roger, who arrived in his seat in February 1250.

During his more than fifteen years in the archbishopric, he was involved from time to time in conflicts both with his flock and with the monarch. In his last years, Archbishop Roger suffered from gout that also paralyzed him. He was buried in the Cathedral of Saint Domnius.

Comments and renditions of his work
Carmen Miserabile super Destructione Regni Hungariae per Tartaros, ed., L. Juhasz, in I Szentpetery, ed., Scriptores Rerum Hungaricarum, 2 vols.  (Budapest 1937-1938) 11, 543-88;
German translation by H. Gockenjan in Ungarns Geschichtsschreiber, 111: Der Mongolensturm.
Russian translation by A. Dosaev in Магистр Рогерий. Горестная песнь о разорении Венгерского королевства татарами. СПб.: Дмитрий Буланин, 2012, 304 с..
C. de Bridia, Historia Tartarorum, ed., A. Onnerfors (Berlin 1967); an English translation in R.A. Skelton, T.E. Marston, and G.D. Painter, The Vinland Map and the Tartar Relation (New Haven 1965) 54-101.
William of Rubruck, Itineraarium, ed., A. Van den Wyngart, Sinica Franciscana 1, 147-332; an English translation in Dawson, op. cit. (At n. 6)87-220.

Footnotes

References
 Archdeacon Thomas of Split: History of the Bishops of Salona and Split (Edited, translated and annotated by Damir Karbić, Mirjana Matijević Sokol, and James Ross Sweeney) (2006). CEU Press. . 
 Curta, Florin (2006). Southeastern Europe in the Middle Ages, 500-1250. Cambridge University Press. .
 Master Roger's Epistle to the Sorrowful Lament upon the Destruction of the Kingdom of Hungary by the Tatars (Translated and Annotated by János M. Bak and Martyn Rady) (2010). In: Rady, Martyn; Veszprémy, László; Bak, János M. (2010); Anonymus and Master Roger; CEU Press; .

External links 
 Rogerius de Apulia: Carmen miserabile super destructione regni Hungariae per Tartaros. Bibliotheca Augustana. Retrieved 2022-05-13.

1205 births
1266 deaths
13th-century Italian Roman Catholic archbishops
Hungarian people of Italian descent
Italian chroniclers
Hungarian chroniclers
Historians of Hungary
People from the Province of Foggia
Archbishops of Split
13th-century Hungarian people